Hans Kalt (later Kalt-Jans, 26 March 1924 – 2 January 2011) was a Swiss rower who competed in the 1948 Summer Olympics and in the 1952 Summer Olympics.

In 1948 he won the silver medal with his brother Josef Kalt in the coxless pair event. Four years later he won the bronze medal with his partner Kurt Schmid in the coxless pair competition.

References

External links
 Zum Tod unseres Ehren- und Gründungsmitglieds Hans Kalt-Jans in: Curling Club Zug; Archive

1924 births
2011 deaths
Swiss male rowers
Olympic rowers of Switzerland
Rowers at the 1948 Summer Olympics
Rowers at the 1952 Summer Olympics
Olympic silver medalists for Switzerland
Olympic bronze medalists for Switzerland
Olympic medalists in rowing
Medalists at the 1952 Summer Olympics
Medalists at the 1948 Summer Olympics
European Rowing Championships medalists
20th-century Swiss people